The MFF Ooredoo Cup 2014 was the 2014 edition of the MFF Cup. The winner qualified for the 2015 AFC Cup.

A total of 22 teams entered the competition.

First round
Draw held on 31 March 2014.

Matches played on 5 and 6 April 2014.

|}

Second round
Draw held on 2 May 2014.

Matches played on 7, 8 and 9 May 2014.

|}

Third round
Draw held on 30 June 2014.

Matches played on 5, 6 and 7 July 2014.

|}

Quarter-finals
Matches played on 20 and 21 July 2014.

|}

Semi-finals
Matches played on 6 August 2014.

|}

Final
Final played on 21 September 2014.

References

External links
MFF Ooredoo Cup

General Aung San Shield
Cup
Burma